Bonnie Castillo is the executive director of National Nurses United and of the California Nurses Association/National Nurses Organizing Committee. Castillo also held the positions of CNA/NNOC director of government relations and NNU director of health and safety. She has been with CNA/NNOC for almost two decades in a number of capacities, working her way up into the leadership of the organization from her early days as a registered nurse member who helped to unionize her facility, to staff and then lead organizer, to a director, and now to her current position as executive director. Castillo was named to the Time 100 list of the most influential people in the world for the year 2020. In January 2021, Castillo was named to The Nation annual honor roll, which recognizes progressive activists and leaders who helped keep hope alive and set the groundwork for transformational change in 2021.

References

1960 births
American women nurses
American trade union leaders
Living people
National Nurses United
American nurses
American women trade unionists
California State University, Sacramento alumni
21st-century American women